Christopher Cole (born February 3, 1996) is an American soccer player who plays as a defender for USL League One club Richmond Kickers.

Career

Youth, college and amateur
Cole played as part of the Eastside FC Premier academy, before heading to play college soccer at Lenoir–Rhyne University in 2014. After his freshman season, he transferred to Bellevue College, and then spent three years at Seattle Pacific University.

In 2019, Cole also spent time with USL League Two side Seattle Sounders FC U-23.

Professional
In March 2021, Cole was invited to trial with USL League One side Richmond Kickers during their pre-season. He earned his first professional contract with the Kickers on April 29, 2021. He made his debut on May 2, 2021, appearing as a 68th-minute substitute during a 2–1 loss to Fort Lauderdale CF.

References

External links
 

1995 births
Living people
American soccer players
Association football defenders
Richmond Kickers players
Seattle Sounders FC U-23 players
Soccer players from Washington (state)
Lenoir–Rhyne Bears men's soccer players
Seattle Pacific Falcons men's soccer players
USL League One players
USL League Two players